Petri Pitkäjärvi (born February 5, 1976) is a Finnish former professional ice hockey right winger.

Pitkäjärvi played 36 games for Jokerit during the 1997–98 SM-liiga season, scoring no points. He then played in the I-Divisioona for Haukat before joining Kiekko-Vantaa in 2000 where he remained for the rest of his career until his retirement in 2008. His number 10 jersey is retired by Kiekko-Vantaa in his honour.

References

External links

1976 births
Living people
Finnish ice hockey right wingers
Jokerit players
Kiekko-Vantaa players
Ice hockey people from Helsinki